Jung Han from Yale University, New Haven, CT was named Fellow of the Institute of Electrical and Electronics Engineers (IEEE) in 2013 for contributions to epitaxial technologies for wide bandgap semiconductor materials and devices.

References

Fellow Members of the IEEE
Yale University faculty
21st-century American engineers
Living people
Year of birth missing (living people)
Place of birth missing (living people)
American electrical engineers